José Eduardo de Andrade (born 8 July 1999), commonly known as Zé Eduardo, is a Brazilian footballer who plays for Portuguese club Varzim, as a forward.

Career statistics

Club

References

1999 births
People from Natal, Rio Grande do Norte
Sportspeople from Rio Grande do Norte
Living people
Brazilian footballers
Association football forwards
Cruzeiro Esporte Clube players
Villa Nova Atlético Clube players
América Futebol Clube (RN) players
Leixões S.C. players
Varzim S.C. players
Campeonato Brasileiro Série D players
Campeonato Brasileiro Série B players
Liga Portugal 2 players
Brazilian expatriate footballers
Expatriate footballers in Portugal
Brazilian expatriate sportspeople in Portugal